James "Jim"/"Jimmy" Cowan (born ) is a former professional rugby league footballer who played in the 1990s.

International honours
Cowan won a cap for Scotland while at Oldham 1996 1-cap.

References

External links
Statistics at orl-heritagetrust.org.uk 

1975 births
Living people
English people of Scottish descent
English rugby league players
Oldham R.L.F.C. players
Place of birth missing (living people)
Rugby league wingers
Scotland national rugby league team players